Ambassador Motorcycles is a British motorcycle manufacturer. Founded by racer Kaye Don after the World War II, the company produced lightweight motorcycles with Villiers and JAP engines  and imported Zundapps from Germany. Production started in 1947 with a 197 cc Villiers-engined bikes.  In 1953 a model was produced with electric starters and the first Ambassador twin appeared in 1957.
The company was taken over by DMW in 1963 who continued production until they closed the company in 1965. Ambassador Motorcycles was reformed in late 2016.

History
Founded by Irish motorcycle racer and 1920s Brooklands star Kaye Don in 1946 as "U.S. Concessionaires Ltd.", the company was started to import American cars. Motorcycle development started with a 494 cc vertical twin JAP-engined prototype. In 1947 the small Villiers engines were  introduced and proved successful so were used until 1964.  Ambassador motorcycles were costly and did not sell well, but exports to Australia and New Zealand were successful.

Models

References

External links
Gallery 
The Ambassador moped

Motorcycle manufacturers of the United Kingdom
Defunct motor vehicle manufacturers of England